Carl John Frosch (September 6, 1908 – May 18, 1984) was a Bell Labs researcher who discovered that silicon could be protectively coated with silicon dioxide by the right exposure to oxygen when hot. Such protective coating overcame a problem of surface states found in active silicon circuit elements. The discovery also revealed the potential for the process of silicon etching.

This discovery process was akin to that of penicillin in that an accidental event led to the discovery of the solution to a major problem.

References
 Michael Riordan & Lillian Hoddeson (1997) Crystal Fire, page 222, W. W. Norton & Company  .

Specific

External links
 Silicon Burns A description of the discovery from the point of view of a colleague at Bell Labs.

1908 births
1984 deaths
Scientists at Bell Labs